Republic of Biak-na-Bato is a designation referring to the second revolutionary republican government led by Emilio Aguinaldo during the Philippine Revolution, That government referred to itself as Republic of the Philippines (in modern ) and was seated in what is now Biak-na-Bato National Park. The current designation was adopted by historians to avoid confusion with name of the current Philippine government, which also refers to itself the Republic of the Philippines, and with other past Philippine governments using the same designation.

The Biak-na-Bato republic lasted just over a month. It was disestablished by a peace treaty signed by Aguinaldo and the Spanish Governor-General, Fernando Primo de Rivera, which included provision for exile of Aguinaldo and key associates to Hong Kong.

Background
The Republic of Biak-na-Bato was one of a number of Filipino revolutionary states that were formed to expel the Spanish colonial regime in the Philippines and were not able to receive international recognition. It was preceded and succeeded by two similarly unrecognized states, the Tejeros government and the Central Executive Committee.

Government
The constitution of the Republic of Biak-na-Bato was written by Felix Ferrer and Isabelo Artacho, who copied the Cuban Constitution of Jimaguayú nearly word-for-word. It provided for the creation of a Supreme Council, which was created on November 1, 1897, with the following as officers having been elected:

History
The initial concept of the republic began during the latter part of the Philippine Revolution, when the now-undisputed leader of the Revolution, Emilio Aguinaldo, became surrounded by Spanish forces at his headquarters in Talisay, Batangas. Aguinaldo slipped through the Spanish cordon and, with 500 picked men, proceeded to Biak-na-Bató, ("Cleft Rock"; in modern ) a wilderness area at  the town of San Miguel, Bulacan (now parts of San Miguel, San Ildefonso and Doña Remedios in Bulacan). When news of Aguinaldo's arrival there reached the towns of central Luzon, men from the Ilocos provinces, Nueva Ecija, Pangasinan, Tarlac, and Zambales renewed their armed resistance against the Spanish.

Unable to persuade the revolutionaries to give up their arms, Governor-General Primo de Rivera issued a decree on July 2, 1897, which prohibited inhabitants from leaving their villages and towns. Contrary to his expectations, they continued fighting. Within days, Aguinaldo and his men planned the establishment of a Republic. Aguinaldo issued a proclamation from his hideout in Biak-na-Bato entitled "To the Brave Sons of the Philippines", in which he listed his revolutionary demands as:

the expulsion of the Friars and the return to the Filipinos of the lands which they had appropriated for themselves;
representation in the Spanish Cortes;
freedom of the press and tolerance of all religious sects;
equal treatment and pay for Peninsular and Insular civil servants;
abolition of the power of the government to banish civil citizens;
legal equality of all persons.

On November 1, 1897, the provisional constitution for the Biak-na-Bato Republic was signed. The preamble of the constitution included the statement that:

By the end of 1897, Governor-General Primo de Rivera accepted the impossibility of quelling the revolution by force of arms. In a statement to the Cortes Generales, he said, "I can take Biak-na-Bato, any military man can take it, but I can not answer that I could crush the rebellion." Desiring to make peace with Aguinaldo, he sent emissaries to Aguinaldo seeking a peaceful settlement. Ironically, nothing was accomplished until Pedro A. Paterno, a known turncoat and a lawyer from Manila, volunteered to act as negotiator.

On August 9, 1897, Paterno proposed a peace based on reforms and amnesty to Aguinaldo. In succeeding months, practicing shuttle diplomacy, Paterno traveled back and forth between Manila and Biak-na-Bato carrying proposals and counterproposals. Paterno's efforts led to a peace agreement called the Pact of Biak-na-Bato. This consisted of three documents, the first two being signed on December 14, 1897, and the third being signed on December 15; effectively ending the Republic of Biak-na-Bato.

In 1899, Aguinaldo wrote in retrospect that the principal conditions of the pact were:

Legacy

On November 16, 1937, a 2,117-hectare block in the Biak-na-Bato area was declared a national park by Manuel L. Quezon in honor of the Republic. In the 1970s, Ferdinand Marcos issued orders guiding mineral prospecting and exploitation in government reservation, impacting the park's boundaries. On April 11, 1989, Corazon Aquino issued Proclamation No. 401, which re-defined the boundaries of the Biak-na-Bato National Park. The proclamation set aside  hectares as mineral reservation,  hectares as watershed reservation and  hectares as forest reserve.

See also
List of unofficial presidents of the Philippines
Political history of the Philippines

Notes

Citations

References

External links

 A complete collection of Philippine Constitutions
 Biak-na-Bato Constitution  
 Natural Springs and Caves of Biak Na Bato, philippinesinsider.com
 Biak na Bato, waypoints.ph
 Biak na Bato, txtmania.com

1897 disestablishments
Former countries in Philippine history
Philippine Revolution
States and territories established in 1897
History of Bulacan